The following soldiers serving on the Western Front with the New Zealand Expeditionary Force were executed for military offences during World War I. The executions, carried out by firing squad, were not made public at the time. All five were posthumously pardoned on 14 September 2000, when New Zealand's Pardon for Soldiers of the Great War Act became law. The bill was presented by Mark Peck, Member of Parliament for Invercargill. The vote was 112 for the motion and five against.

List
{| class="wikitable"
! width=15%|Name
! width=4%|Age
! width=10%|Unit
! width=10%|Executed
! Offence
! Notes

|-
|| Frank Hughes
|| 28
|| 2nd Bn,Canterbury Regt
|| 25 Aug 1916
|| Desertion
|| Poor military and disciplinary record, deserted en route to the front.
|-
|| John Sweeney
|| 37
|| 1st Bn,Otago Regt
|| 2 Oct 1916 
|| Desertion 
|| An Australian, born in Tasmania. His brother died on the Western Front in 1918, while his father committed suicide in 1925, just before details of his execution were made public.
|-
|| John Braithwaite
|| 31
|| 2nd Bn,Otago Regt
|| 29 Oct 1916 
|| Mutiny
|| Prior to the war, he had worked as a journalist in Australia. After being incarcerated for repeatedly being AWOL, he was accused of instigating a prison riot, although he claimed that he only involved himself to assist in break it up.
|-
|| John King
|| 32
|| 1st Bn,Canterbury Regt
|| 19 Aug 1917 
|| Desertion
|| Had a long record of going absent, desertion and illness; possibly an alcoholic. 
|-
|| Victor Spencer
|| 23
|| 1st Bn,Otago Regt
|| 24 Feb 1918 
|| Desertion 
|| Deserted from near the front line. A Māori engineer in a non-Māori pioneer unit, shell-shocked in July 1915.
|}

References

Sources
 Pugsley, Christopher (1991). On the Fringe of Hell. Auckland: Hodder & Stoughton. 
 Putkowski, Julian & Sykes, Julian (1966). Shot at Dawn: Executions in World War One by Authority of the British Army Act. Barnsley: Pen & Sword 
 Public Record Office, London, Judge Advocate General's Register.
 Archives New Zealand, BRAITHWAITE, Jack - WW1 24/1521 - Army, Ref: AABK 18805 W5520/110.
 New Zealand Pardon for Soldiers of the Great War Act 2000
 The executed five Great War Story from nzhistory.net video
 The executed five Great War Story from newshub video

External links
 Memorial 'Shot at Dawn' for these five soldiers.

Military discipline and World War I
New Zealand in World War I